The satinbirds or cnemophilines, are a family, Cnemophilidae of passerine birds which consists of four species found in the mountain forests of New Guinea. They were originally thought to be part of the birds-of-paradise family Paradisaeidae until genetic research suggested that the birds are not closely related to birds-of-paradise at all and are perhaps closer to berry peckers and longbills (Melanocharitidae). The current evidence suggests that their closest relatives may be the cuckoo-shrikes (Campephagidae).

Etymology 
The family name "Cnemophilidae" consists of the words knemos for "mountain/slope" and philos for "lover", referring to the species' fondness for mountain slopes.

Description 
The satinbirds are all very beautifully colored in their own right. The males of the red satinbird are a rich reddish orange to a flame red on their upperparts, sporting dark blackish to black underparts and also have light, purplish erectile sagittal crest that lies on the crown and extends from the forehead to nearly the back of the head. Females of this species are an olive brown with paler underparts. Male yellow satinbirds have brilliant, silky, flame-yellow plumage above, with a black throat, black chin, black belly and black rump, and glistening golden crest plumes, while females are brownish to olive above with pale light yellow underparts. 

The other two species, Loria's and yellow-breasted satinbirds are much more different from the aforementioned species. Loria's satinbid male is mostly black with shiny purple or metallic sheens; they have iridescent light blue secondary wing feathers, iridescent blue tail feathers, and an iridescent greenish-aqua patch of feathers leading from the base of the bill to right above the eyes. Females, like the others mentioned above, are olive greenish with lighter underparts. Male yellow-breasted satinbirds have reddish-olive upperparts, except for the upper rump, which is a yellow gold. The underparts are golden yellow from the chin and cheeks to the breast, then fades to a paler yellow wash past the breast. Unique for the satinbirds, the males also have bulbous wattles, or lobes, on the top of the bill that are a pale sky blue in color. The female is brownish rufous above and cream below with brownish streaks from the chin to the breast.

Satinbirds have weak, non-manipulative feet, wide gapes (at one time they were given the name "wide-gaped bird-of-paradise"), as well as an unossified nasal region. Their bodies are compact with rounded wings.

Distribution and habitat
Loria's satinbird may have the broadest range in the central highlands, mostly from 2000–4000 m, but is inconspicuous except at fruiting trees. The red satinbird inhabits high mountain forest and shrubbery. The yellow-breasted satinbird is the least known. Almost nothing is known of its biology, and it seems scarce and local within the patches of habitat along the central ranges east to the base of the Huon Peninsula. Yellow satinbirds are found only in the "Bird's Tail" region in South East New Guinea.

Behavior and ecology
All species of satinbirds build domed nests, unlike those of birds of paradise. The female lays a single egg and takes care of it without any assistance from the male. Satinbirds feed exclusively on fruit, even at a young age.

Species 
 Genus Cnemophilus
Loria's satinbird, Cnemophilus loriae
Red satinbird, Cnemophilus sanguineus
Yellow satinbird, Cnemophilus macgregorii (split as a species in 2016 from C. sanguineus) 
 Genus Loboparadisea
Yellow-breasted satinbird, Loboparadisea sericea

References 
 : What is not a bird of paradise? Molecular and morphological evidence places Macgregoria in the Meliphagidae and the Cnemophilinae near the base of the corvoid tree. Proceedings of the Royal Society B. 267: 233–241.
 : Bird: The Definitive Visual Guide: Page 371. Dorling Kindersley.

External links 
 Satinbirds